The Webber Douglas Academy of Dramatic Art, formerly the Webber Douglas School of Singing and Dramatic Art, was a drama school, and originally a singing school, in London. It was one of the leading drama schools in Britain, and offered comprehensive training for those intending to pursue a professional performance career.

History
The school was founded in London in 1926 as the Webber Douglas School of Singing, by Walter Johnstone Douglas (youngest son of Arthur Johnstone-Douglas) and Amherst Webber. It was created from the singing academy founded in 1906 in Paris by Jean de Reszke. By 1932, the school had added full theatrical training to its curriculum, and was renamed the Webber Douglas School of Singing and Dramatic Art. It was located at 30 Clareville St in South Kensington.

In 2006, the academy was absorbed into the Central School of Speech and Drama. Many of the academy's past alumni have formed a theatre company dedicated to keeping the original spirit of the school alive. In 2009, the Central School of Speech and Drama renamed its Embassy Studio the Webber Douglas Studio.

Alumni
See :Category:Alumni of the Webber Douglas Academy of Dramatic Art

Steven Berkoff
Hugh Bonneville
Nicola Bryant
Natalie Dormer
Minnie Driver
Rupert Evans
JJ Feild
Julian Fellowes
Gregory Finnegan
Johnny Flynn
Rebecca Front
Matthew Goode
Ross Kemp
Angela Lansbury
Nigel Lindsay
Katy Manning
Julia Ormond
Douglas Reith
Ben Roberts
Amanda Root
John Sackville
Antony Sher
Donald Sinden
Samantha Spiro
Terence Stamp
Bill Treacher
Shaun Williamson

Notes

External links

Central School of Speech and Drama homepage
Walter Henry George Johnstone-Douglas in Burke's Landed Gentry

1926 establishments in the United Kingdom
2006 disestablishments in the United Kingdom
 
Drama schools in London
Royal Central School of Speech and Drama
Educational institutions established in 1926
Educational institutions disestablished in 2006
Arts organizations established in 1926
Arts organizations disestablished in 2006